Ancyluris meliboeus (meliboeus swordtail) is a butterfly of the family Riodinidae. It is found in Suriname, Brazil, Colombia, Bolivia and Peru.

The wingspan is about 40 mm. A recent study has shown that it has patches of unusual microstructure on the ventral wing scales. This highly tilted, multilayered arrangement produces a bright iridescence of broad wavelength range and generates a strong flicker contrast from minimal wing movement.

Subspecies
Ancyluris meliboeus meliboeus (Surinam, Brazil (Amazonas), Peru)
Ancyluris meliboeus euaemon (Peru, Colombia, Bolivia)
Ancyluris meliboeus julia (Brazil)

External links
Now you see it - now you don’t, a study - Study of the iridescence of the wings

Riodinini
Butterflies described in 1777
Riodinidae of South America